Marie Bouzková and Sara Sorribes Tormo defeated Natela Dzalamidze and Kamilla Rakhimova in the final, 6–3, 6–4 to win the doubles title at the 2022 İstanbul Cup.

Veronika Kudermetova and Elise Mertens were the defending champions, but the pair withdrew from the tournament before their first-round match.

Seeds

Draw

Draw

References

External links
 Main draw

Istanbul Cup - Doubles
2022 Doubles
2022 in Istanbul
2022 in Turkish sport